Thomas Bardolf, 5th Baron Bardolf (22 December 1369 – 19 February 1408) was a baron in the Peerage of England, Lord of Wormegay, Norfolk, of Shelford and Stoke Bardolph in Nottinghamshire, Hallaton (Hallughton), Leicestershire, and others, and was "a person of especial eminence in his time".

A supporter of the rebellion of Henry Percy, 1st Earl of Northumberland, against King Henry IV of England after the death of Percy's son Harry Hotspur, he died from wounds received at the Battle of Bramham Moor.

Life
The eldest son of William 4th Lord Bardolf, Knight, of Wormegay and his wife Agnes de Poynings, Thomas Bardolf de Wormegay, 5th Baron Bardolf, was summoned to the Parliament of England from 12 September 1390 to 25 August 1404.

He took part with Henry Percy, 1st Earl of Northumberland, and others, in their insurrection against King Henry IV, and being pursued by the Royal army in great force, was obliged to flee to France. But about three years after returning to England, he resumed his alliance with the Earl of Northumberland, Thomas Mowbray (Earl Marshall), and Richard le Scrope, Archbishop of York, only to be defeated again in Yorkshire by John of Lancaster and the Earl of Westmorland. The king ordered the execution of Mowbray and Scrope, who were subsequently beheaded at York.

Finally, in 1408, at the Battle of Bramham Moor, the rebels suffered a total defeat. Northumberland was slain, and Lord Bardolf was "so much hurt" that he died of his wounds soon after.

Bardolf had married Avicia (or Amice), daughter of Ralph de Cromwell, 2nd Baron Cromwell. He left two daughters, Anne and Joan, his co-heirs. However, his honours and lands had already been forfeited to the Crown by attainder.

Aftermath
William Dugdale states that "Lord Bardolf's remains were quartered, and the quarters disposed of by being placed above the gates of London, York, Lenne [possibly King's Lynn?], and Shrewsbury, while the head was placed upon one of the gates of Lincoln; his widow obtained permission, however, in a short time, to remove and bury them".

The estates were divided between Thomas Beaufort, 1st Duke of Exeter (the king's half-brother), Sir George de Dunbar, Knight, and Joan of Navarre, Queen of England; but the latter's portion, upon the petition of his daughters Anne (with her husband Sir William Clifford, knt.) and Joan (with her husband Sir William Phelip), to the king, was granted in reversion, after the Queen's decease, to those sons-in-law of the attainted nobleman.

Also, on "27 April 1407. The King to the sheriff of Lincoln. Referring to the late plea in Chancery between Amicia (sic) wife of Thomas, late lord of Bardolf, and George de Dunbarre regarding certain lands in Ruskynton forfeited by Thomas, which had been granted by the King to George, with the manor of Calthorpe, the half of Ancastre (and many others), wherein it was adjudged that Rusynton should be excepted from the grant and restored to her with the rents, etc., from 27 November 1405, drawn by George, - the King orders him to restore the same to Amicia. Westminster. [Close, 9 Henry IV. m.17.]".

Arms
Bardolf’s coat of arms was blazoned Azure, three cinquefoils, or, meaning three gold cinquefoil flowers on a blue shield.

Notes

References
 Burke, Sir Bernard, Norroy King of Arms, The Extinct Peerage of England, Ireland, and Scotland, p. 22-23.
 Burke, Messrs., John and John Bernard, The Extinct & Dormant Baronetcies of England, Ireland, and Scotland, 2nd edition, 1841, p. 594.
 Bulwer, Brigadier-General, editor, The Visitation of Norfolk, 1563, Norwich, 1895, p. 270, where he is designated "Thomas Bardolf of Spixworth, Knight".

14th-century births
1408 deaths
14th-century English politicians
15th-century English politicians
15th-century soldiers
5
English expatriates in France
English military personnel killed in action
English rebels
English soldiers
People convicted under a bill of attainder
People from King's Lynn and West Norfolk (district)
Year of birth unknown
People from Spixworth